The Beau-Marks were a Canadian rock music group formed in 1958 in Montreal, Quebec. Their first release, the April 1959 single "Rockin' Blues" b/w "Moonlight Party", came out under the name The Del-Tones, but the group changed their name soon afterward in a nod to the Bomarc missile. Their breakthrough hit was "Clap Your Hands," which hit #1 in Canada and Australia, peaked at #45 on the US Billboard pop charts, and #40 on Cashbox. The tune was also released in French as "Frappe Tes Mains" and a Quebec version as "Tape des mains", lyrics by late Michel A. Lebel, as one of Rock n' Roll Queen Lucie Marotte's finale favorites. Their debut, ten-track full-length came out in 1960; they appeared on American Bandstand and at a charity concert at Carnegie Hall soon afterwards. Two more albums followed before the group broke up in 1963; a 1968 reunion saw "Clap Your Hands" get a re-release. 

The Beau-Marks were the first Canadian band to be headliners at the Peppermint Lounge in New York City and to be invited to appear on The Ed Sullivan Show.

Members
Raymond "Ray" Hutchinson - guitar
Michel "Mike" Robitaille - guitar and bass
Joseph "Joey" Fréchette - piano
Gilles Tailleur - drums

Discography
The High Flying Beau-Marks (1960)
The Beau-Marks in Person! Recorded on Location at Le Coq D'Or (1961)
The Beau-Marks (1962)
Lucie Marotte (1990) - Tape des mains

See also

Canadian rock
Music of Canada

References

External links
Beau Marks Biography
Beau Marks Discography I
Beau Marks Discography II
The Beau-Marks; The Canadian Encyclopedia
 Article at canadianbands.com
 

Canadian rock music groups
Musical groups from Montreal
Musical groups established in 1958
Musical groups disestablished in 1963
1958 establishments in Quebec